Richard Taunton Sixth Form College, until 2012 called Taunton's College, is a sixth form college in Upper Shirley, Southampton attended by approximately 1000 students.

Admissions
It offers a range of courses, mostly A Levels. Many students participate in a range of extracurricular activities.

It is situated to the west of Southampton Common next to the Bellemoor pub at the junction of Hill Lane and Bellemoor Road. Near to the south is King Edward VI School, Southampton.

History

Foundation
Taunton's School was founded in 1760 by Richard Taunton, former Mayor of Southampton. In 1864 it moved to a specially built site on New Road. In 1875 it was established as an endowed school, to be called Taunton's Trade School. The school became a public secondary school and the name changed once more to Taunton's School.

Grammar school
In 1926, the school moved to a new campus on Highfield Road. It was officially opened by Eustace Percy, 1st Baron Percy of Newcastle (then the Coalition Conservative MP for Hastings) on 26 April 1927.  It was administered by the City of Southampton Education Committee. In 1968 it had around 850 boys.

Sixth form college
In 1969, it was reorganised as a sixth form college for boys and renamed to Richard Taunton College. From 1978 girls were admitted.

Hill College
Meanwhile, in 1858, the Southampton College and High School for Girls was founded. In 1936 it moved to a site on Hill Lane. In 1967, it was reorganised as a sixth form college for girls and renamed to Southampton College for Girls. Boys were admitted from 1979, along with a name change to Hill College, reflecting the location of the college.

Merger
In 1989 the two colleges merged using the name Taunton's College although the Hill Lane site was refurbished and moved into in 1993.

Redevelopment proposal 2007
A 2007 redevelopment proposal for Taunton's College, on Hill Lane in Southampton, which proposed replacement of nearly all the buildings on the site including the main building completed in 1937 as the Southampton Grammar School for Girls was formally cancelled by June 2009.

Funds hoped for the redevelopment of many sixth form and Further Education colleges throughout England were revealed earlier in 2009 to be insufficient for a mooted major national programme of rebuilds. Taunton's proposal was one of many which in the outturn could not be funded.

Name Change
On 11 July 2012, Taunton's College changed its name to Richard Taunton Sixth Form College.

Notable alumni

 Benny Hill, comedian
 Alex Bellos, writer
 Craig David, musician
 Gareth Bale, Welsh international footballer
 Chris Packham, naturalist and television presenter
 Chris Tremlett, cricketer
 Manisha Tank, presents World Report on CNN
 Theo Walcott, English international footballer

Taunton's School
 Prof Brian Barry, Lieber Professor of Political Philosophy from 1998–2005 at Columbia University, New York
 Major General Daniel Beak, VC
 Martin Bell, poet
 Paul Bennett, footballer
 Eugene Bernard, footballer
 Martin Chivers, footballer
 Norman Cole, footballer
 George Robert Graham Conway, civil engineer and historian
 Denis Henry Desty, scientist and inventor
 Sir William Arthur Dring, General Manager, East India Railway
 Gavyn Davies, BBC Chairman
 Edward Grayson, barrister and author
 Benny Hill, comedian
 Bertram Maurice Hobby, entomologist
 Clive Hollick, Baron Hollick, chief executive from 1996–2005 of United Business Media
 Eric James, Baron James of Rusholme, first Vice-Chancellor from 1962–73 of the University of York
 Charles Knott, cricketer
 Bernard Lee, actor
 Jack Mantle, VC
 Eric Moon, librarian
 Dominic Muldowney, composer, and Music Director from 1976–97 of the Royal National Theatre
 Horace King, Baron Maybray-King, Labour MP from 1955–71 for Southampton Itchen, and from 1950–5 for Southampton Test
 Bob Mitchell, Labour MP from 1971–83 for Southampton Itchen, and from 1966–70 for Southampton Test
 Air Commodore Frank Padfield, first programme director of the Skynet British military satellite system
 Sir Donald Perrott, UK Atomic Energy Authority
 Julian Peto
 Sir Richard Peto, Professor of Medical Statistics and Epidemiology since 1992 at the University of Oxford
 Dick Rowley, footballer
 Ken Russell, film director
 John Stonehouse, former politician who notoriously faked his own death in 1974.
 Derek Tulk, cricketer

References

External links
 
 Old Tauntonians' Association
 EduBase

Education in Southampton
Sixth form colleges in Hampshire
International Baccalaureate schools in England